Patania scinisalis is a species of moth in the family Crambidae. It was described by Francis Walker in 1859. It is found in the Himalayas, India (Assam), Myanmar, Taiwan and Japan.

References

Moths described in 1859
Spilomelinae